was a Japanese botanist, author of several papers and monographs on phytogeography including work on roses and Amygdaloideae (Rosaceae), maples (Aceraceae), mulberries (the genus Morus), and many other plants. His name is sometimes transliterated as Gen’ichi or Gen-Iti, or as Koizumi.

Biography
Gen-ichi Koidzumi was born in Yonezawa in Yamagata Prefecture in 1883. After graduating from the Sapporo Agricultural College, he studied biology at Tokyo Imperial University from 1905, continuing his studies there under Matsumura Jinzō, and receiving his doctorate in 1916. In 1919, he was appointed assistant professor at Kyoto Imperial University, where he remained (other than for a tour of the herbaria of Europe and the United States from 1925 to 1927) until his retirement in 1943; he was promoted to full professor in 1936. In 1932, he founded the Societas Phytogeographica and the journal Acta Phytotaxonomica et Geobotanica. Koidzumi died in his hometown of Yonezawa in 1953. According to the International Plant Names Index, in total he published over 1,600 new botanical names.

Published works 
 1956. Plants of Jaluit Island (Pacific surveys report / U.S. Army, Corps of Engineers, Far East)
 1952. The Big Button Palm which produces the ivory nut ([Reports] - USGS, Pacific Geological Surveys)
 1930. , 115 pp.
 1928. Plantae Novae Amami-Ohsimensis nec non Insularum adjacentium: 1 Phytogeographical notes on the flora of the Loochoo Archipelago. 2 Description of new species. 19 pp.

References

 Further reading 
 Nakaike, T, A Yamamoto. 2002. Enumeration of the Latin names of pteridophytes published by Dr. Gen'ichi Koidzumi''. Journal of Phytogeography and Taxonomy 50 (1): 63–68. ISSN 0388-6212

Botanists with author abbreviations
20th-century Japanese botanists
1883 births
1953 deaths
Japanese taxonomists